Tilly Lockey (born 7 October 2005) is a British amputee known for her bionic arms developed by Open Bionics, which she has used since 2016. In 2021, she competed and went on to win the sixth series of the CBBC competition series Got What It Takes?.

Life and career 
Lockey contracted meningococcal septicaemia as a baby in 2007, at the age of 15 months. Despite her parents being told that she was likely to die, Lockey survived following a successful operation to have both arms and her toes amputated.

Lockey was initially provided with simple prosthetics from the NHS. While researching 3D printing, Lockey's mother discovered Open Bionics, who were looking for a below-the-elbow amputee to trial new prosthetic arms. Since being chosen in 2016, Lockey has used bionic arms developed by the company, which enable her to perform actions such as picking up small objects and playing video games. These arms are the first of their kind to be medically approved in Britain.

In 2014, Lockey's custom-made bicycle was stolen; it was recovered four days later and two people were charged.

One set of arms used by Lockey was based on the Deus Ex video game series. In 2019, she received new custom arms designed by the team creating Alita: Battle Angel.

Lockey has created and shared make-up tutorials online, and will be presenting the children's news show FYI on Sky. She featured in the video for Kate Nash's song Bad Lieutenant in 2019.

In 2021, Lockey competed in the sixth series of the CBBC competition series Got What It Takes?. On 6 July 2021, she was announced as the winner of the series.

References

External links 
 
 Tilly Lockey on YouTube

British amputees
People from County Durham
2005 births
Living people